__notoc__

On December 11, 1941, the United States Congress declared war on Germany (Sess. 1, ch. 564), hours after Germany declared war on the United States after the attack on Pearl Harbor by the Empire of Japan. The vote was 88–0 in the Senate and 393–0 in the House.

Text

See also 

 Arcadia Conference
 Declarations of war during World War II
 Diplomatic history of World War II
German declaration of war against the United States (1941)
Kellogg–Briand Pact
United Kingdom declaration of war on Germany (1939)
 United States declaration of war upon Germany (1917)
United States declaration of war upon Italy
United States declaration of war upon Japan

References

External links

1941 in Germany
1941 in international relations
1941 in military history
1941 in the United States
Declarations of war during World War II
Germany–United States military relations
Germany
December 1941 events
1941 documents
Axis powers